Mark Bulkeley (born 3 April 1979) is a British sailor who competed in the 2004 Summer Olympics.

References

External links 
 
 
 

1979 births
Living people
Olympic sailors of Great Britain
British male sailors (sport)
Sailors at the 2004 Summer Olympics – Tornado
Extreme Sailing Series sailors